The Copa América is South America's major tournament in senior men's soccer and determines the continental champion. Until 1967, the tournament was known as South American Championship. It is the oldest continental championship in the world.

Mexico are not members of the South American football confederation CONMEBOL, but because CONMEBOL only has ten member associations, guest nations have regularly been invited to participate in the Copa América since 1993. Mexico have been the most regular invitee, competing in ten consecutive Copas from 1993 to 2016. However, they did not play in the 2019 edition and the 2021 edition.

Mexico have reached the final twice, and finished third on three more occasions. This makes Mexico the most successful invitee by far, and are even ahead of CONMEBOL member Venezuela in the Copa América all-time table.

Record at the Copa América

* Draws include matches decided on penalties.

Record by opponent

Mexico's highest victory at a Copa América was a 6–0 win against Paraguay in 2007. Their highest defeat was a 0–7 loss against eventual champions Chile in 2016.

Record players

Rafael Márquez is one of only two players to compete in Copa Américas 17 years apart, the other being Álex Aguinaga. Concerning the exact time span between first and last match, Márquez is trailing 30 days behind Aguinaga's record of 17 years and 9 days.

Top goalscorers

Awards and Records

Team Awards
 Runners-up: 1993, 2001
 Third place: 1997, 1999, 2007

Individual Awards
 Top Scorer 1995: Luis García (4 goals) (shared)
 Top Scorer 1997: Luis Hernández (6 goals)

Team Records

 Non-CONMEBOL member with most appearances (10)

See also

Mexico at the FIFA World Cup
Mexico at the CONCACAF Gold Cup

References

External links
RSSSF archives and results
Soccerway database

Countries at the Copa América
Mexico national football team